Ngwana Mohube Sports Ground, also commonly referred to as Ngwana Mohube Sports Complex, is a low level football stadium in the village Ga-Mphahlele; situated around 8 km East of Lebowakgomo and 60 km South of Polokwane, in the Limpopo province of South Africa.

Football related tenants
Since June 2010, the main tenant of Ngwana Mohube Sports Ground is Baroka FC. This club is based in the same village, and currently compete at the third level of South African football, known as Vodacom League. As Baroka in 2008-10 had opted to play their home games at the somewhat greater Lebowakgomo Stadium, one might speculate, that at least the playing field of Ngwana Mohube Sports Ground, perhaps got improved in 2010.

Facilities
The capacity of the Sports Ground is currently unknown. In regards of facilities, they were in April 2011 described as being second to none. Currently the Sports Ground lack some proper dressing rooms, and is even without toilets and running water.

External links
No official website, or pictures of Ngwana Mohube Sports Ground, currently exist.

References

Sports venues in Limpopo
Soccer venues in South Africa